Map of places in Angus compiled from this list

This List of places in Angus is a list of links for any town, village, hamlet, castle, golf course, historic house, nature reserve, reservoir, river, and other place of interest in the Angus council area of Scotland.

A
Aberlemno, Aberlemno Stones
Airlie, Airlie Castle
Aldbar Castle
Angus Folk Museum
Angus transmitting station
Arbirlot
Arbroath, Arbroath Abbey, Arbroath Mortuary Chapel, Arbroath Museum
Ardovie
Ark Hill
Ascreavie House
Ashludie
Auchmithie
Auchterhouse
Auldbar Road railway station

B
Backwater Reservoir
Balbirnie Mill
Balgavies Loch
Balintore, Balintore Castle
Balmashanner Hill
Balnaboth House
Barrie's Birthplace Museum
Barry, Barry Links railway station, Barry Watermill
Bell Rock Lighthouse
Birkhill
Black Watch Memorial
Boddin
Bowriefauld
Blaikie Castle
Braes of Angus
Brechin, Brechin Bridge, Brechin Castle, Brechin Cathedral, Brechin Museum, Brechin railway station, Brechin Satellite Earth Station
Bridge of Dun railway station
Bridgend of Lintrathen
Bridgefoot
Broomfield Golf Course
Burnside Cottage
Burnside of Duntrune

C
Caddam Wood
Caenlochan
Cairngorms National Park
Careston
Carlogie
Carlungie and Ardestie earthhouses
Carmyllie
Carnoustie, Carnoustie Golf Links, Carnoustie railway station
Caterthun
Clova Castle
Colliston Castle
Cortachy Church
Craigo
Craigowl Hill
Crombie Country Park

D
Dalhousie, Dalhousie Arch
Dun
Dunnichen
Dunninald, Dunninald Castle
Dykend

E
Eassie
East Haven
Edzell, Edzell Castle
Elliot, Elliot Water
Ethie Castle

F
Falls of Drumly Harry
Farnell
Fern
Ferryden
Finavon Castle, Milton of Finavon
Five Glens of Angus
Forfar, Forfar Loch
Fowlis, Fowlis Castle, Fowlis Collegiate Church
Friockheim

G
Gagie House
Gardyne Castle
Gayfield Park
Glamis Castle
Glebe Park
Glen Doll
Glen Mark
Glencadam Distillery
Glenesk Folk Museum
Golf Street railway station
Grampian Mountains
Guthrie, Guthrie Castle

H
Hatton Castle
Hillside
Hospitalfield House
House of Dun
House of Pitmuies
Hynd Castle

I
Inchbraoch
Inchcape
Inverarity
Inverkeilor
Invermark Castle
Inverquharity Castle

K
Kemps Castle
Kerr's Miniature Railway
Kilry Glen
Kinblethmont
Kingennie
Kingsmuir
Kinnaber
Kinnaird, Kinnaird Castle
Kinnell
Kinnettles
Kirkbuddo
Kirkinch
Kirkton of Glenisla
Kirkton of Kingoldrum
Kirriemuir, Kirriemuir Aviation Museum, Kirriemuir Gateway to the Glens Museum

L
Ledyatt Loch
Letham
Leysmill
Liff

Links Park
Little Forter
Loch Lee
Loch of Kinnordy
Logie Cemetery
Lunan Bay, Lunan Water
Lunanhead
Lundie

M
Mains Castle, Mains of Fintry
Maison Dieu Chapel
Maryton
Marywell
Meffan, Meffan Museum
Melgam Water
Melgund Castle
Menmuir
Mile Hill
Milton of Ogilvie
Monifieth, Monifieth railway station
Monikie, Monikie Country Park
Montreathmont Moor
Montrose, Montrose Air Station Heritage Centre, Montrose Basin, Montrose Basin Wildlife Centre, Montrose Medal Golf Course
Mount Keen
Murroes

N
Newbigging
Newtyle
North Water Viaduct

O
Oathlaw
Old Balkello

P
Panbride Church
Panmure Castle, Panmure Golf Club, Panmure House
Pictavia
Piperdam
Pirner's Brig

R
Red Castle
Rescobie Loch
Restenneth Priory
River South Esk
River Tay
RM Condor
Ruthven, Ruthven Castle

S
Scurdie Ness
Seaton Cliffs
Shanwell
Sidlaw Hills
Signal Tower Museum
St Orland's Stone
St Vigeans, St Vigeans Church
Station Park
Stone of Morphie
Stracathro
Strathmore

T
Tannadice
Tarfside
Tealing
Templeton

W
Wellbank
Wester Denoon
Whigstreet

See also
List of places in Scotland
List of places in Aberdeenshire
List of places in Dundee
List of places in Perth and Kinross

Geography of Angus, Scotland
Lists of places in Scotland
Populated places in Scotland